Maureen O'Sullivan (17 May 1911 – 23 June 1998) was an Irish-American actress, who played Jane in the Tarzan series of films during the era of Johnny Weissmuller. She starred in dozens of feature films across a span of more than half a century and performed with such actors as Laurence Olivier, Greta Garbo, Fredric March, William Powell, Myrna Loy, Marie Dressler, Wallace Beery, Lionel Barrymore, the Marx Bros. (Groucho, Harpo and Chico) and Woody Allen. In 2020, she was listed at number eight on The Irish Times list of Ireland's greatest film actors.

Early life
O'Sullivan was born in Boyle, County Roscommon, Ireland, in 1911, the daughter of Mary Eva Lovatt (née Frazer) and Charles Joseph O'Sullivan, an officer in the Connaught Rangers who served in World War I. Maureen returned to Boyle in 1988 to be honoured by the town. She attended a convent school in Dublin, then the Convent of the Sacred Heart at Roehampton (now Woldingham School), England. One of her classmates there was Vivian Mary Hartley, future Academy Award-winning actress Vivien Leigh. After attending finishing school in France, O'Sullivan returned to Dublin to work with the poor. In October 1929, she sailed to New York with her mother on the British steamer , on the way to Hollywood to work for the Fox Film Corporation.

Film career

O'Sullivan's film career began when she met motion picture director Frank Borzage, who was doing location filming on Song o' My Heart (released in 1930) for 20th Century Fox. He suggested she take a screen test. She did and won a part in the movie, which starred Irish tenor John McCormack. She traveled to the United States to complete the movie in Hollywood. She appeared in six movies at Fox, then made three more at other studios.

In 1932 she signed a contract with Metro-Goldwyn-Mayer. After several roles there and other studios, she was chosen by Irving Thalberg to appear as Jane Parker in Tarzan the Ape Man, with costar Johnny Weissmuller. One of MGM's more popular ingenues through the 1930s, she appeared in a number of other productions with various stars. She played Jane in six Tarzan features between 1932 and 1942.

She was featured with William Powell and Myrna Loy in The Thin Man (1934) and played Kitty in Anna Karenina (1935) with Greta Garbo, Fredric March, and Basil Rathbone. After costarring with the Marx Brothers in A Day at the Races (1937), she appeared as Molly Beaumont in A Yank at Oxford (1938), written partly by F. Scott Fitzgerald.

She appeared in Pride and Prejudice (1940) with Laurence Olivier and Greer Garson, and supported Ann Sothern in Maisie Was a Lady (1941). After appearing in Tarzan's New York Adventure (1942), O'Sullivan asked MGM to release her from her contract so she could care for her husband, John Farrow, who had just left the Navy with typhoid. She retreated from show business, devoting her time to her family. In 1948, she reappeared on the screen in The Big Clock, directed by her husband for Paramount Pictures. She continued to appear occasionally in her husband's movies and on television. 

In 1958, Michael Farrow, eldest son of John Farrow and Maureen O'Sullivan, died in a plane crash in California.

By 1960, O'Sullivan believed she had permanently retired. However, actor Pat O'Brien encouraged her to take a part in summer stock, and the play A Roomful of Roses opened in 1961. It led to her Broadway debut in Never Too Late with costar Paul Ford. Shortly after it opened, Farrow died of a heart attack. 

O'Sullivan stuck with acting after Farrow's death; she was the Today Girl for NBC for a while, then made the movie version of Never Too Late (1965) for Warner Bros. She was also an executive director of a bridal consulting service, Wediquette International. 

In June and July 1972, O'Sullivan was in Denver, Colorado, to star in the Elitch Theatre production of Butterflies are Free with Karen Grassle and Brandon deWilde. The show ended on 1 July 1972.

When her daughter, actress Mia Farrow, became involved with Woody Allen both professionally and romantically, she appeared in Allen's Hannah and Her Sisters, playing Farrow's mother. She had roles in Peggy Sue Got Married (1986) and the science fiction oddity Stranded (1987). In 1994, she appeared with Robert Wagner and Stefanie Powers in Hart to Hart: Home Is Where the Hart Is, a feature-length made-for-TV movie with the wealthy husband-and-wife team from the popular weekly detective series Hart to Hart.

Personal life

O'Sullivan's first husband was Australian-American writer, award-winning director and Catholic convert John Villiers Farrow, from 12 September 1936 until his death on 28 January 1963. She and Farrow had seven children: Michael Damien (1939–1958), Patrick Joseph (Patrick Villiers Farrow, 1942–2009), Maria de Lourdes Villiers (Mia Farrow, b. 1945), John Charles (b. 1946), Prudence Farrow (b. 1948), Stephanie Farrow (b. 1949) and Theresa Magdalena "Tisa" Farrow (b. 1951). Mia Farrow gave two of her children, Dylan and Ronan, the middle name of O'Sullivan.

O'Sullivan married James Cushing, a wealthy businessman, on 22 August 1983; they remained wed until her death in 1998. She became a U.S. citizen on 22 October 1947 (Petition for Naturalization #133033) in Los Angeles, California.

O'Sullivan was a Catholic. A Democrat, she supported Adlai Stevenson during the 1952 presidential election.

Death

O'Sullivan died in Scottsdale, Arizona, of complications from heart surgery, on 23 June 1998, at age 87. She was buried at Most Holy Redeemer Cemetery, Niskayuna, New York, Cushing's hometown.

Legacy
O'Sullivan has a star on the Hollywood Walk of Fame at 6541 Hollywood Boulevard, facing the star of Johnny Weissmuller. A black plaque marks her home on Main Street in Boyle, County Roscommon, Ireland. Just around the corner from there, opposite King House, is a tree, ceremonially planted by O'Sullivan to mark her return to her birthplace.

In 1982, O'Sullivan received the George Eastman Award, given by George Eastman House for distinguished contribution to the art of film.

Filmography

Feature films

Short subjects
Hollywood Extra: The First Step (1936) as Herself
Hollywood – The Second Step (1936)
Unusual Occupations: Film Tot Holiday (1947)
Screen Snapshots: Hollywood Shower of Stars (1955)
Mandy's Grandmother (1978) as Grandmother

Television work

Radio appearances

References

External links

 
 
 
 
 Maureen O'Sullivan as "Jane" Photo Gallery
 Photographs of Maureen O'Sullivan

1911 births
1998 deaths
20th-century American actresses
20th-century Irish actresses
20th Century Studios contract players
American stage actresses
American television actresses
American film actresses
Arizona Democrats
Burials in New York (state)
Irish stage actresses
Irish television actresses
Irish emigrants to the United States
Irish film actresses
People educated at Woldingham School
People from Boyle, County Roscommon
Metro-Goldwyn-Mayer contract players
Naturalized citizens of the United States
California Democrats